Beitang may refer to the following locations in China:

Beitang District (北塘区), Wuxi, Jiangsu
Beitang Subdistrict (北塘街道), Binhai, Tianjin
Beitang Church, or Xishiku Cathedral, in Xicheng District, Beijing